La légion saute sur Kolwezi, also known as Operation Leopard, is a French war film directed by Raoul Coutard and filmed in French Guiana. The script is based on the true story of the Battle of Kolwezi that happened in 1978. It was diligently described in a book of the same name by former 1st Foreign Parachute Regiment Captain Pierre Sergent. He published his book in 1979, and the film came out in 1980. Coutard shot the film in a documentary style.

Plot 
The film is based on true events. In 1978, approximately 3,000 heavily armed fighters from Katanga crossed the border to the Zaire and marched into Kolwezi, a mining centre for copper and cobalt. They took 3,000 civilians as hostages. Within a few days, between 90 and 280 hostages were killed. The rebels appeared to be unpredictable and are reported to have threatened to annihilate all civilians.

Mobutu Sese Seko, Zaire's head of state, urged Belgium, France and the United States to help. France sent the Foreign Legion's 2nd Foreign Parachute Regiment, which were flown from Corsica to Kolwezi. Following their arrival, they secured the perimeter, in co-operation with Belgian soldiers from Zaire, and then started to evacuate the civilians. Within two days more than 2,000 Europeans and about 3,000 African citizens were saved. The film strives to depict the events in a dramatised form, concentrating on the Europeans' plight.

Production
The late Jean Seberg had filmed scenes on location for the film, but her death caused her to be replaced by another French American actress, Mimsy Farmer, who reshot Seberg's scenes.

Cast
 Bruno Cremer: Pierre Delbart
 Jacques Perrin:Ambassador Berthier
 Laurent Malet: Phillipe Denrémont
 Pierre Vaneck: Colonel Grasser
 Mimsy Farmer: Annie Devrindt
 Giuliano Gemma: Adjudant Fédérico
 Robert Etcheverry : Colonel Dubourg
 Jean-Claude Bouillon : Maurois

References

Sources
This article incorporates information from the French Wikipedia.

External links

 (Original French version)

1980 films
1980s war drama films
Films about hostage takings
Films set in 1978
1980s French-language films
French war drama films
Cold War films
Films set in the Democratic Republic of the Congo
Films shot in French Guiana
War films based on actual events
Films about the French Foreign Legion
1980s French films